Sulphur Creek is a slot canyon canyoneering route found in Capitol Reef National Park in Utah, United States. It is a 6.25 mile hike one way and has been categorized by the state of Utah as an easy hiking trail. The canyon contains waterfalls, pools, overhangs and red sandstone, and a shallow stream that runs through it year-round. The route begins from near the Chimney Rock trailhead and ends at the Visitor Center. The rocks at Sulphur Creek are some of the oldest exposed rocks in Capitol Reef.

Sulphur Creek empties into the Fremont River at the town of Fruita, located within Capitol Reef National Park.

History
During the building of the Transcontinental Railroad, David Kimball, Herber Kimball and W. Riley Judd sub-contracted to build part of the railroad along Sulphur Creek

See also

 List of rivers of Utah

References

External links

Rivers of Utah
Rivers of Wayne County, Utah
Capitol Reef National Park